Lesotho is an enclaved, landlocked country in southern Africa surrounded by South Africa. Previously known as Basutoland, Lesotho declared independence from the United Kingdom on 4 October 1966. It is a member of the United Nations, the Commonwealth of Nations and the Southern African Development Community (SADC). The name Lesotho translates roughly into the land of the people who speak Sesotho. About 40% of the population lives below the international poverty line of US$1.25 a day.

Notable firms 
This list includes notable companies with primary headquarters located in the country. The industry and sector follow the Industry Classification Benchmark taxonomy. Organizations which have ceased operations are included and noted as defunct.

See also 
 Economy of Lesotho
 List of banks in Lesotho

References 

 
Lesotho